Por amor (For love) is a Mexican telenovela produced by Irene Sabido for Televisa in 1981. It is an original story by Rita Valencia and Manuel de la Rosa. It starred by María Sorté, Manuel Ojeda, Adriana Roel, Carlos Cámara, Chela Nájera and Salvador Sánchez.

Cast 

María Sorté as Belén
Manuel Ojeda as Ernesto
Adriana Roel as Mercedes
Carlos Cámara as Rosendo
Chela Nájera as Josefina
Salvador Sánchez as Cenobio 
Silvia Caos as Aurelia 
Rafael Sánchez Navarro as Sergio Antonio
Aurora Clavel as Sabina 
Luis Rábago as Javier 
Lucha Altamirano as Lupita 
July Furlong as Marcia 
Fernando Rubio
Bárbara Córcega as Rosita 
Marco Antonio Infante as Abelardo 
Alejandra Espejo as Leticia 
Evangelina Martínez as Nachita 
Maricruz Nájera as Julia 
Miguel Ángel Ferriz 
Eduardo Palomo
Guillermo Orea as José María
Amparo Arozamena as Luisa Fernanda
Lucía Guilmáin as Paulina 
Carlos Bonavides as Félix 
María Luisa Coronel as Gudelia
Ricardo de Loera as Luis
Graciela Díaz de la Garza as Laura
Rosa Elena Díaz as Teofilita 
Tita Greg as Carmen
Mónica Miguel as Ramona
Polo Ortín as Rafael
Héctor Téllez as Dr. Jorge
Juan Antonio Yáñez as Dr. Diego

References

External links

Mexican telenovelas
1981 telenovelas
Televisa telenovelas
Spanish-language telenovelas
1981 Mexican television series debuts
1981 Mexican television series endings